NGC 2748 is a spiral galaxy in the northern circumpolar constellation of Camelopardalis, located at a distance of  from the Milky Way. It was discovered September 2, 1828 by John Herschel. The morphological classification of SAbc indicates this is an unbarred spiral with moderate to loosely-wound spiral arms. It is a disk-like peculiar galaxy with a stellar shell that is rotating about the main galactic axis. This shell was most likely formed through the capture and disruption of a dwarf companion.

A magnitude 14.5 supernova, designated SN 1985A, was discovered in this galaxy on January 25, 1985. It was designated SN 2013ff and reached magnitude 15.2. Subsequent studies found a best match to a type Ic supernova. The discovery of a supernova impostor in this galaxy was announced February 10, 2015. During September 2017, the discovery of supernova SN2017gkk in host galaxy NGC 2748 was announced.

References

External links
 
 Images
 Spectral data
 Supermassive black hole mass measurements for NGC 1300 and NGC 2748 based on HST emission-line gas kinematics

Unbarred spiral galaxies
2748
26018
Camelopardalis (constellation)